Estradiol glucuronide, or estradiol 17β-D-glucuronide, is a conjugated metabolite of estradiol. It is formed from estradiol in the liver by UDP-glucuronyltransferase via attachment of glucuronic acid and is eventually excreted in the urine by the kidneys. It has much higher water solubility than does estradiol. Glucuronides are the most abundant estrogen conjugates.

When exogenous estradiol is administered orally, it is subject to extensive first-pass metabolism (95%) in the intestines and liver. A single administered dose of estradiol is absorbed 15% as estrone, 25% as estrone sulfate, 25% as estradiol glucuronide, and 25% as estrone glucuronide. Formation of estrogen glucuronide conjugates is particularly important with oral estradiol as the percentage of estrogen glucuronide conjugates in circulation is much higher with oral ingestion than with parenteral estradiol. Estradiol glucuronide can be converted back into estradiol, and a large circulating pool of estrogen glucuronide and sulfate conjugates serves as a long-lasting reservoir of estradiol that effectively extends its elimination half-life of oral estradiol. In demonstration of the importance of first-pass metabolism and the estrogen conjugate reservoir in the pharmacokinetics of estradiol, the elimination half-life of oral estradiol is 13 to 20 hours whereas with intravenous injection its elimination half-life is only about 1 to 2 hours.

Approximately 7% of estradiol is excreted in the urine as estradiol glucuronide.

Estradiol glucuronide is transported into prostate gland, testis, and breast cells by OATP1A2, OATP1B1, OATP1B3, OATP1C1, and OATP3A1. The ABC transporters MRP2, MRP3, MRP4, and BCRP, as well as several other transporters, have been found to transport estradiol glucuronide out of cells.

The circulating concentrations of estrogen glucuronides are generally more than 10-fold lower than those of estrone sulfate, the most abundant estrogen conjugate in the circulation.

Estradiol glucuronide has been identified as an agonist of the G protein-coupled estrogen receptor (GPER), a membrane estrogen receptor. This may be involved in estradiol glucuronide-induced cholestasis.

Estrogen glucuronides can be deglucuronidated into the corresponding free estrogens by β-glucuronidase in tissues that express this enzyme, such as the mammary gland. As a result, estrogen glucuronides have estrogenic activity via conversion into estrogens.

Estradiol glucuronide shows about 300-fold lower potency in activating the estrogen receptors relative to estradiol in vitro.

The positional isomer of estradiol glucuronide, estradiol 3-glucuronide, also occurs as a major endogenous metabolite of estradiol, circulating at two-thirds of the levels of estrone sulfate when it reaches its maximal concentrations just before ovulation and during the peak in estradiol levels that occurs at this time.

See also
 Catechol estrogen
 Estradiol sulfate
 Estriol glucuronide
 Estriol sulfate
 Estrogen conjugate
 Lipoidal estradiol
 List of estrogen esters § Estradiol esters

References

External links
 Metabocard for 17β-Estradiol Glucuronide - Human Metabolome Database

Estradiol esters
Estranes
Estrogens
Glucuronide esters
Hepatotoxins
Human metabolites